Anisopleurodontis is a genus of prehistoric shark, the remains of which have been discovered in the Pedra de Fogo Formation of Brazil. There is only one species, the type species, A. pricei. It is a member of the Holocephali, the group that includes chimaeras and ratfish.

References

Prehistoric sharks
Permian animals of South America
Permian Brazil
Fossils of Brazil
Fossil taxa described in 1994